Colombia Tierra de Atletas–GW–Shimano is a Colombian-based women's road cycling team that was founded in 2020.

Major results
2021
Overall Vuelta Femenina a Guatemala, Lorena Colmenares
Stages 1 & 3, Lorena Colmenares
Stages 2 & 5, Jannie Salcedo

2022
Overall Clasica Ciudad de Huaca, Lorena Colmenares
Stages 1 (ITT) & 3, Lorena Colmenares

National champions
2020
 Colombia Time Trial, Ana Sanabria

2021
 Pan American Road Race, Lina Hernandez
 Colombia Road Race, Lorena Colmenares

2022
 Colombia Time Trial, Lina Hernandez

References

Cycling teams based in Colombia
Cycling teams established in 2020